Devoe or DeVoe may refer to:

 Devoe (name)
 Bell Biv DeVoe, American music group
Ronnie DeVoe, group member of the American music trio Bell Biv DeVoe
 Mount DeVoe, mountain in Canada
 Emma Smith DeVoe, American suffragette and political activist
 Clifford DeVoe, the name of a DC Comics villain who takes the title "The Thinker", an archnemesis of the Flash